Rupertiella is a monotypic genus of flowering plants belonging to the family Menispermaceae. The only species is Rupertiella boliviana.

Its native range is Western South America to Brazil.

References

Menispermaceae
Menispermaceae genera
Monotypic Ranunculales genera